Jason Harmon (born January 27, 1987) is a former professional football wide receiver. He played college football at Florida Atlantic.

Professional career

Jacksonville Jaguars
Harmon was signed as an undrafted free agent by the Jacksonville Jaguars after the 2010 NFL Draft. Harmon was waived/injured on August 5, 2010.

Toronto Argonauts
On June 1, 2011, Harmon signed with the Toronto Argonauts of the Canadian Football League. He was assigned to the team's practice roster on June 24, 2011, but was released from the practice roster on July 4, 2011.

Lakeland/Florida Marine Raiders
In 2013 and 2014, Harmon played as a member of the Lakeland/Florida Marine Raiders.

External links
 Florida Atlantic bio
 Jacksonville Jaguars bio
 Toronto Argonauts bio

1987 births
Living people
Sportspeople from Newport News, Virginia
Players of American football from Virginia
American football wide receivers
American football tight ends
Florida Atlantic Owls football players
Jacksonville Jaguars players
Toronto Argonauts players
Lakeland Raiders players
Riverview High School (Riverview, Florida)